Peschanka is a rural locality (a settlement) in Krasnoslobodsk, Sredneakhtubinsky District, Volgograd Oblast, Russia. The population was 542 as of 2010.

Geography 
The village is located on the left bank of the Sudomoyka Erik, 19 km WSW from Srednyaya Akhtuba.

References 

Rural localities in Sredneakhtubinsky District